Khar-polis (literally "donkey-cop") is an Iranian game played by two teams of approximately 5 to 7. It is also played by Mexicans and is called Chinche al Agua ("bird to water").

Terminology
First, one team is designated as a Khar team, and the other team is designated as the Polis team. The Khar team forms a line in this manner: First, one person leans his back against a wall. This person is called Mikh. The Mikh person forms a lock with his hands, and keeps his locked hands in front of himself. Then, the second person in the Khar team rests his forehead in the locked hands of the Mikh, thus bending forward. This person also puts one of his legs (typically the left leg) in front, and his other leg (typically the right leg) to the back. Then, the third person in the Khar team locks his hands around the upper part of the backward leaning leg of the second person, and he himself bends down with one leg in the front and one leg to the back. The rest of the Khar team follow suit, each bending down with one leg in front and one leg in back, while locking their hands around the upper leg of the person immediately in front of them. This forms a line, which is collectively called Khar.

Rules
Once the line is formed, the players of the Polis (cop) team start jumping on the line, which creates the appearance of a person riding on the back of a donkey. The goal of the Polis team is to put pressure on the Khar team, so that their line collapses to the ground. The Khar team, on the other hand, is supposed to withstand the pressure until all of the Polis team players have jumped. At that point, after a count to ten, if the Khar team has not collapsed onto the ground, the teams switch sides.

Even if one of the Khar team players cannot withstand the pressure and falls to the ground, the line is considered to have collapsed. The expression used is Khar khabid, which means "The donkey went down." If this happens, the Khar team will have to form a line for another round of jumping. On the other hand, if one of the Polis team members loses his balance and falls to the ground while being mounted on the line, the Polis team is lost that round, and it will be their turn to be the Khar team.

Once each member of the Polis team has jumped on the line, he is not permitted to crawl forward to create space for his teammates to jump. Neither team is allowed to rattle or otherwise shake the line in order to make the other team collapse or fall off.

Videos
Iranian men playing Kharpolis

References

Combat sports
Games of physical skill
Iranian folklore